The Swan Lake First Nation (meaning The lake that is curved) is a Saulteaux band government located along Swan Lake in the Pembina Valley Region of Manitoba, Canada.

Its main reserve is Swan Lake 7, which is surrounded by the Municipality of Lorne; the First Nation also has economic initiatives located at their reserve nearby the Rural Municipality of Headingley (IR 8A).

Reserve lands 

Swan Lake First Nation divided into 4 reserve lands:

 Swan Lake 7 ( 7) — surrounded by the Municipality of Lorne (Swan Lake); totalling  in size, this is the First Nation's main reserve
 Forest Hills (IR 7a) — located by Carberry; totalling  in size, it consists of residential and commercial developments
 Indian Gardens (IR 8) — located by Rathwell; totalling  in size, most (75%) of this land is under agricultural lease
 Headingley (IR 8a) — located by the RM of Headingley; totalling  in size, this location is planned to consist of mainly commercial developments

External links
 Map of Swan Lake 7 at Statcan

References 

 
 Swan Lake First Nation - Band History

Dakota Ojibway Tribal Council
Dakota
First Nations governments in Manitoba

First Nations in Southern Manitoba
Saulteaux